Radamés Torruella (28 September 1940 – 7 February 2016) was a Puerto Rican sailor. He competed in the Flying Dutchman event at the 1968 Summer Olympics. Served in the United States Army in the Vietnam War. He later graduated in Business and Finance at the Wharton School of the University of Pennsylvania in 1966 and from the University of Puerto Rico School of Law in 1969.

References

External links
 

1940 births
2016 deaths
Puerto Rican male sailors (sport)
Olympic sailors of Puerto Rico
Sailors at the 1968 Summer Olympics – Flying Dutchman
Sportspeople from San Juan, Puerto Rico
University of Puerto Rico alumni
United States Army personnel of the Vietnam War
United States Army soldiers
Wharton School of the University of Pennsylvania alumni
20th-century Puerto Rican people